Eric Snow (born April 5, 1973) is an American basketball coach and former professional player. He played the point guard position in the National Basketball Association from 1995 to 2008 and appeared in three NBA Finals. Known for his defense, Snow was named to the NBA All-Defensive Second Team in 2003. Following his playing career, Snow served as an assistant coach at Florida Atlantic for two years (2014-2016) after having worked two seasons at SMU (2012–14) as the director of player development under Larry Brown, his former coach.

High school career
Snow began his basketball career at Canton McKinley High School in Canton, Ohio. He was McKinley High School's MVP for three straight seasons.

College career
Snow attended college at Michigan State University. He played varsity basketball at Michigan State under head coach Jud Heathcote. In his senior season, the Spartans earned a #3 seed to the 1995 NCAA Tournament, but they were upset in the first round by Weber State University.

NBA career

Seattle SuperSonics 
After college, Snow was selected by the Milwaukee Bucks with the 43rd overall pick in the 1995 NBA draft. He was immediately traded to the Seattle SuperSonics, where he played sparingly for the next two-and-one-half seasons.

Philadelphia 76ers 
On January 18, 1998, Snow was acquired from Seattle by the Philadelphia 76ers in exchange for a second-round draft pick. At the time of the trade, Snow was averaging just 4.4 minutes per game; Sixers head coach Larry Brown gave him a bigger role in Philadelphia. In his first full season in Philadelphia, he started every game he played in and averaged 35.8 minutes per game.

As a pass-first, defensive-minded point guard, Snow became a stalwart of the Brown-era 76ers teams. Snow's ability to guard opposing teams' shooting guards made him an ideal complement to Allen Iverson, a high-scoring but unusually small shooting guard. Despite missing thirty-two games early in the 2000–01 season due to injury, Snow played a crucial role in helping the 76ers earn the top playoff seed in the Eastern Conference and ultimately reach the 2001 NBA Finals, where they lost in five games to the Los Angeles Lakers. During the following season, Lakers shooting guard Kobe Bryant stated that nobody in the league defended him better than Snow.

In 2002–03, Snow posted career highs in points per game (12.9), rebounds per game (3.7), minutes per game (37.9), field goal percentage (45.2%), and free throw percentage (85.8%). Snow's excellent free throw percentage was particularly noteworthy, as he had been a very poor foul shooter in college and early in his NBA career, averaging 52.1% from the stripe during his four seasons at Michigan State and 59.2% as a rookie. He also averaged 6.6 assists and 1.6 steals per game in 2002–03.

Cleveland Cavaliers 
On July 20, 2004, Snow was traded to the Cavaliers in exchange for Kevin Ollie and Kedrick Brown. He was suspended without pay for a December 18, 2004 game against the Boston Celtics after a confrontation with Paul Silas, the coach of the Cavaliers. It was the only game that Snow missed in his first three years with the Cavaliers. He had a season-high 16 points on January 22, 2005 against the Golden State Warriors and a season-high 13 assists on April 19, 2005 against the Boston Celtics (which is also his high assist total as a Cavalier). Snow ranked fifth in the NBA in assist-to-turnover ratio (3.56); he donated $20 for every one of his steals and assists during the 2004–05 season.

Snow played in and started all 82 games for the Cavaliers in the 2005-06 season, helping the Cavaliers return to the playoffs for the first time since 1998. He started all 13 playoff games for the Cavaliers. He scored 18 points in a Game 5 victory over the Washington Wizards during the first round of the playoffs before losing to the Detroit Pistons in 7 games in the semifinals.

The following season, for the fifth and final time in his career, Snow played in all 82 games. He had a season high 18 points on January 13, 2007 against the Los Angeles Clippers and a season-high 11 assists on January 20, 2007 against the Golden State Warriors. However, he gradually lost playing time through the course of the season to Daniel Gibson, until he came off the bench on January 30, 2007, bringing an end to Snow's streak of starts that lasted for 127 games. The Cavaliers made the NBA Finals and lost to the San Antonio Spurs in a sweep that year.

In his 13th NBA season, Snow was named team co-captain, along with LeBron James. Snow only played in 22 games that season. On March 11, 2008, it was announced that Snow would miss four to six weeks due to arthritic-related symptoms in his left knee, ending his season. After the injury, Snow conceded that he likely would not play in the NBA again.

Unable to play, but still listed as an active player on the Cavaliers' roster, Snow served on Head Coach Mike Brown's staff as an unofficial assistant coach for the 2008-09 season. On April 4, 2009, Snow was given a "medically necessary" release and began working as an analyst for NBA TV.

Achievements 
During his playing career, Snow reached the NBA Finals three times (and once with each of the teams on which he played): the SuperSonics in 1996, the 76ers in 2001, and the Cavaliers in 2007. All three appearances were losses. In Philadelphia and Cleveland, Snow served as team co-captain along Allen Iverson and LeBron James, respectively.

Coaching career
Snow was hired as assistant coach for the Texas Legends in 2017 through NBA's Assistant Coaches Program (ACP) after his two-year spell as assistant coach for the Florida Atlantic University. Prior to that, Snow had been the director of player development for the Southern Methodist University through 2012–2014.

Personal life
Snow is the younger brother of former linebacker Percy Snow, who also played at Michigan State University and played for both the Kansas City Chiefs and the Chicago Bears of the NFL. He married his college girlfriend, Deshawn in 1998, the two divorced in 2010. The couple have three sons: Jarren, Darius, and Eric Jr. With second wife Carrie he has sons Noah, Graceson and Brayden 

His son Darius signed to play football with Michigan State for the class of 2020.

NBA career statistics

Regular season 

|-
| align="left" | 1995–96
| align="left" | Seattle
| 43 || 1 || 9.0 || .420 || .200 || .592 || 1.0 || 1.7 || .6 || .0 || 2.7
|-
| align="left" | 1996–97
| align="left" | Seattle
| 67 || 0 || 11.6 || .451 || .267 || .712 || 1.0 || 2.4 || .6 || .0 || 3.0
|-
| align="left" | 1997–98
| align="left" | Seattle
| 17 || 0 || 4.4 || .435 || .000 || .500 || .2 || .8 || .0 || .1 || 1.5
|-
| align="left" | 1997–98
| align="left" | Philadelphia
| 47 || 0 || 18.0 || .429 || .125 || .721 || 1.6 || 3.5 || 1.3 || .1 || 3.9
|-
| align="left" | 1998–99
| align="left" | Philadelphia
| 48 || 48 || 35.8 || .428 || .238 || .733 || 3.4 || 6.3 || 2.1 || .0 || 8.6
|-
| align="left" | 1999–00
| align="left" | Philadelphia
| 82 || 80 || 35.0 || .430 || .244 || .712 || 3.2 || 7.6 || 1.7 || .1 || 7.9
|-
| align="left" | 2000–01
| align="left" | Philadelphia
| 50 || 50 || 34.8 || .418 || .263 || .792 || 3.3 || 7.4 || 1.5 || .1 || 9.8
|-
| align="left" | 2001–02
| align="left" | Philadelphia
| 61 || 61 || 36.5 || .442 || .111 || .806 || 3.5 || 6.6 || 1.6 || .2 || 12.1
|-
| align="left" | 2002–03
| align="left" | Philadelphia
| 82 || 82 || 37.9 || .452 || .219 || .858 || 3.7 || 6.6 || 1.6 || .1 || 12.9
|-
| align="left" | 2003–04
| align="left" | Philadelphia
| 82 || 82 || 36.2 || .413 || .111 || .797 || 3.4 || 6.9 || 1.2 || .1 || 10.3
|-
| align="left" | 2004–05
| align="left" | Cleveland
| 81 || 15 || 22.8 || .382 || .289 || .738 || 1.9 || 3.9 || .8 || .2 || 4.0
|-
| align="left" | 2005–06
| align="left" | Cleveland
| 82 || 82 || 28.7 || .409 || .100 || .688 || 2.4 || 4.2 || .9 || .2 || 4.8
|-
| align="left" | 2006–07
| align="left" | Cleveland
| 82 || 45 || 23.5 || .417 || .000 || .637 || 2.3 || 4.0 || .7 || .2 || 4.2
|-
| align="left" | 2007–08
| align="left" | Cleveland
| 22 || 5 || 13.9 || .158 || .000 || .455 || .9 || 1.9 || .4 || .2 || 1.0
|- class="sortbottom"
| style="text-align:center;" colspan="2"| Career
| 846 || 551 || 27.3 || .424 || .208 || .763 || 2.5 || 5.0 || 1.1 || .1 || 6.8

Playoffs 

|-
| align="left" | 1996
| align="left" | Seattle
| 10 || 0 || 2.4 || .143 || .000 || .000 || .4 || .6 || .2 || .0 || .2
|-
| align="left" | 1997
| align="left" | Seattle
| 8 || 0 || 6.0 || .455 || .500 || .500 || .3 || 1.5 || .5 || .0 || 1.6
|-
| align="left" | 1999
| align="left" | Philadelphia
| 8 || 8 || 38.3 || .420 || .231 || .815 || 4.1 || 7.1 || 1.0 || .1 || 12.4
|-
| align="left" | 2000
| align="left" | Philadelphia
| 5 || 4 || 27.6 || .484 || .750 || 1.000 || 2.0 || 7.0 || .8 || .2 || 7.4
|-
| align="left" | 2001
| align="left" | Philadelphia
| 23 || 9 || 31.2 || .414 || .000 || .727 || 3.7 || 4.5 || 1.2 || .1 || 9.3
|-
| align="left" | 2002
| align="left" | Philadelphia
| 5 || 5 || 34.2 || .321 || .167 || .773 || 4.4 || 5.4 || 1.2 || .0 || 10.8
|-
| align="left" | 2003
| align="left" | Philadelphia
| 12 || 12 || 34.6 || .422 || .100 || .879 || 3.3 || 5.6 || 1.5 || .0 || 11.5
|-
| align="left" | 2006
| align="left" | Cleveland
| 13 || 13 || 31.4 || .421 || .000 || .759 || 3.3 || 2.8 || .9 || .2 || 6.6
|-
| align="left" | 2007
| align="left" | Cleveland
| 19 || 0 || 12.8 || .316 || .000 || .571 || 1.5 || 1.5 || .6 || .1 || 1.7
|- class="sortbottom"
| style="text-align:center;" colspan="2"| Career
| 103 || 51 || 24.0 || .404 || .200 || .782 || 2.6 || 3.6 || .9 || .1 || 6.6

References

External links

Eric Snow – Official Site
Shoot for the Moon Foundation

1973 births
Living people
20th-century African-American sportspeople
21st-century African-American sportspeople
African-American basketball players
American men's basketball players
Basketball coaches from Ohio
Basketball players from Canton, Ohio
Cleveland Cavaliers players
Florida Atlantic Owls men's basketball coaches
Michigan State Spartans men's basketball players
Milwaukee Bucks draft picks
Philadelphia 76ers players
Point guards
Seattle SuperSonics players
Sportspeople from Canton, Ohio